Thomas Thøgersen (born April 2, 1968) is a Danish former professional footballer who won three Danish football championships with Brøndby IF.

Thøgersen was born in Copenhagen. He made his senior debut with BK Frem in 1989, but left the club when they were relegated in 1993. He moved to Brøndby IF in the top-flight Danish Superliga championship, and helped the club win the 1994 Danish Cup trophy from his position as forward. From 1996 to 1998, he was a part of the Brøndby team which won three Superliga titles in a row. In 1998, he moved abroad to play for English club Portsmouth in the second-tier Football League First Division. Initially playing as a defender, he was eventually moved into the attacking midfielder position. He played a total of 119 games for Portsmouth until 2002, when he returned to end his career with childhood club Frem.

Honours
Danish Cup: 1994
Danish Superliga: 1996, 1997 and 1998

References

External links

 Boldklubben Frem profile
 Venner av Portsmouth profile

1968 births
Living people
Footballers from Copenhagen
Danish men's footballers
Association football utility players
Boldklubben Frem players
Brøndby IF players
Portsmouth F.C. players
Danish Superliga players
English Football League players
Association football fullbacks
Association football midfielders
Association football forwards